Lango may refer to:

Africa
Lango sub-region, previously known as Lango District, Uganda
Lango people, of Uganda
Lango language (Uganda), their language
Lango people (South Sudan)
Lango language (South Sudan), their language
Didinga people of Sudan
Didinga language

Asia
Lango tribe, Pakistan

Europe
Lángos, a Hungarian-style fried bread
 Lango, the Venetian and Genoese name for the Greek island of Kos
 Langø Island, Denmark

Other uses
Lango (app), an icon-based messaging app

Language and nationality disambiguation pages